Blodwen Peak  is a peak on Alexander Island, the largest island of Antarctica.

It is snow and ice free on the north slopes, and is named for one of the three muskeg tractors used in the area in 1974. It was referred to as "The 2nd Pyramid" in scientific reports in the early 1960s, whilst "The 1st Pyramid" was the nickname given to nearby Giza Peak.

Blodwen Peak is about 3 km south-southwest of the British Fossil Bluff aircraft refuelling station.

References 

Mountains of Alexander Island